"Heart to Heart" is a song by American musician Kenny Loggins, Michael McDonald, and composer David Foster. It was released in 1982 as the second of three singles from his 1982 album High Adventure. It reached number 15 on the Billboard Hot 100 and spent five weeks in that position, from late January through late February.  It spent a total of 13 weeks in the Top 40, and 17 weeks on the Hot 100.  It also reached number 15 on the U.S. Cash Box Top 100.

"Heart to Heart" was also very successful on the Adult Contemporary charts, reaching number three in the U.S. and number one in Canada.

Background
The song speaks of the mutual opening of hearts as being the only way to preserve a relationship once the partners have allowed themselves to grow apart. The lyrics acknowledge that most relationships do not endure the test of time, yet still some are able to do so. It features additional vocals by co-writer McDonald and a saxophone solo by David Sanborn.

Personnel
Kenny Loggins – lead vocals
Mike Hamilton – guitar
Michael McDonald – Rhodes piano, synthesizer programming, backing vocals
Neil Larsen – string arrangement
David Foster – grand piano, string arrangement
Derek Jackson – bass guitar
Tris Imboden – drums
Paulinho da Costa – congas
Lenny Castro – percussion
David Sanborn – saxophone
Marty Paich – string arrangements
Richard Page – backing vocals
Steve George – backing vocals

Chart performance

Weekly charts

Year-end charts

References

External links
 

1980s ballads
1982 singles
Kenny Loggins songs
Songs written by Kenny Loggins
Songs written by Michael McDonald (musician)
Songs written by David Foster
Columbia Records singles
1982 songs